Firaya Rifkatovna Sultanova-Zhdanova (born April 29, 1961 in Tyukovo, Tatarstan) is a retired female long-distance runner from Russia. She set her personal best in the women's marathon on June 21, 2003 in Duluth, Minnesota, clocking 2:27:05. Sultanova represented Russia at the 1996 Summer Olympics in Atlanta, Georgia, where she failed to reach the final of the women's 10,000 metres competition.

International competitions

Professional marathons

References

marathoninfo

1961 births
Living people
Sportspeople from Tatarstan
Russian female long-distance runners
Russian female marathon runners
Olympic female marathon runners
Olympic athletes of Russia
Athletes (track and field) at the 1996 Summer Olympics
World Athletics Championships athletes for Russia
Russian Athletics Championships winners
Tatar people of Russia